Doctor Kalyuzhnyy, is a 1939 Soviet drama film directed by Erast Garin and written by Yuri German based on his piece Son of the People (Сын народа).

Plot 
The film tells about a young doctor Kuzma, who, after graduating from the Leningrad Institute, leaves his beloved girl in Leningrad and returns to the Grechishka village where he was born and starts working there.

Starring 
 Boris Tolmazov as Doctor Kalyuzhny
 Mariya Barabanova as Timofeyich
 Yuriy Tolubeev	
 Yanina Zheymo	
 Arkady Raikin
 Valentin Kiselyov
 L. Oreshkin
 Zinaida Kvyatkovskaya	
 T. Sukova
 Konstantin Sorokin	
 G. Gudarov		
 Yekaterina Melentyeva as Frosya

References

External links 
 

1939 films
1930s Russian-language films
Soviet drama films
1939 drama films
Soviet black-and-white films